Orissa is a 2013 Indian Malayalam-language romance film directed by M. Padmakumar. While Unni Mukundan and Sanika Nambiar appear on screen as the lead pair, Kaniha and Tanusree Ghosh also play key characters in the film. Made under the banner of Heera Films, Orissa is the story of a girl called Suneyi — played by Sanika Nambiar — her trials and tribulations. G.S. Anil has scripted the film that has been shot by Vinod Illambally. Music has been composed by Ratheesh Vega. The film released on 17 May 2013.

Plot
The film was based on a Malayali constable Christhudas loving an Odia girl Suneyi.

Cast
 Unni Mukundan as Christhudas
 Sanika Nambiar as Suneyi
 Nedumudi Venu
 Kaniha as Chandrabhaga
 Tanushree Ghosh as Meerabhai
 Sudheesh
 Swasika
 Sadiq
 Shari as Christhudas's Mother
 Nigel Akkara as Kamadeva Pradhan
 Ganja Karuppu
 Sanjeev Chakraborty

Soundtrack
The soundtrack of this film was composed by Ratheesh Vegha. The music is owned by Manorama Music.

Playback singer Karthik was mistakenly awarded the Kerala State Film Award for Best Singer for the song "Janmandarangalil" which was actually sung by Pradeep Chandrakumar. Music director Ratheesh Vegha has revealed that although Karthik was chosen to sing the song, his rendition did not reach perfection and was replaced by Pradeep Chandrakumar who was to sing the track for this song. Pradeep's version was only included in the film and audio CD which was however credited to Karthik for commercial purposes.

Production
The film is produced by Chettikal Madhavan Edappal, and directed by M. Padmakumar who has previously directed movies like Vaasthavam, Shikar - The Hunt, Ithu Pathiramanal etc.

Reception
This movie received average response from the critics and eventually ended up as a box office disaster.

References

External links

2013 films
Indian romance films
Films directed by M. Padmakumar
2010s Malayalam-language films
Films set in Odisha
Films shot in Odisha
Fictional portrayals of the Kerala Police